Apollo 11 was the first human spaceflight to land on the Moon. The 1969 mission's wide effect on popular culture has resulted in numerous portrayals of Apollo 11 and its crew, Neil Armstrong, Buzz Aldrin, and Michael Collins.

Public reception
The mission was extensively covered in the press. Over 53 million US households tuned in to watch the Apollo 11 mission across the two weeks it was on TV, making it the most watched TV programming up to that date. An estimated 650 million viewers worldwide watched the first steps on the Moon.

After their return, the astronauts went on what was called the "Giant Leap" tour, visiting 23 countries in 38 days. Starting in Mexico City, where they donned sombreros and were given a second parade, their tour took them through South America, to Spain, France, the Netherlands, Belgium, Norway, Germany, England, and Vatican City. After a rest in the U.S. embassy in Rome they went on to Turkey and Africa.
In Zaire, Buzz Aldrin leaped over the barricade between him and some entertainers and joined in with their dancing.

Missing from the tour was Hungary, which rejected the United States's invitation to host the astronauts.
Relations between Hungary and the United States were strained at the time over the non-return by the U.S. of the Crown of St Stephen.

Stamps 

Many countries have issued stamps commemorating the mission.

The United States issued a  stamp commemorating the 20th anniversary in 1989, a stamp for the 25th anniversary, and a 33¢ stamp commemorating the 30th anniversary in 1999.
The 20th anniversary stamp caused some concern when it was issued, as the law forbade living people from being depicted on stamps, and the image was of two astronauts planting a U.S. flag on the moon.
However, it was never actually officially stated by the USPS that the figures were specifically Armstrong and Aldrin, and not just generic astronaut figures.
Other stamps issued included a 10¢ stamp on 1969-09-09 showing an astronaut descending a ladder from a lunar module, and the  anniversary stamp issued in 1994.
The 1969 stamp art was by Paul Calle, the 1989 art by his son, and the 1994 one by both.

The postal service of Eire issued a commemorative  stamp for the 50th anniversary in 2019, but mis-spelled the word "gealach" (Gaelic for "moon") as "gaelach" ("Irish"), an accidental transposition during design that was not caught in proof.
The USPS issued two 50th anniversary stamps as part of its "Forever" collection, one a photograph of the moon with the landing site marked, and the other one of Armstrong's pictures of Aldrin.

The astronauts themselves had, before the mission, signed what were called "insurance covers", stamped envelopes that were essentially life insurance in the form of memorabilia that family members could sell off in the events of the astronauts' deaths.
This practice would continue through to Apollo 16.

Armstrong and Aldrin also cancelled a commemorative stamp whilst on the surface of the moon.
Originally, they were to have done this reciting pre-scripted dialogue that had been supplied by USPS public relations.
But the supplied script was lengthy and stilted, the Washington Post commenting that it would have lasted "for the better part of one orbit of the moon" and resulted in "a veritable barrage of phone calls from a flabbergasted public", and NASA decided that the astronauts had enough to do; so the stamping was without ceremony.

Songs 
The first song played from the surface of the moon, chosen by Aldrin, was Quincy Jones's and Frank Sinatra's version of "Fly Me to the Moon".
The BBC had used a hurriedly re-recorded version of David Bowie's "Space Oddity" for its news coverage of the landing, but did not play the song again until the mission was over, because of the way that the song lyrics ended.

Movies 
Contemporary movies that did well because of the public's interest in the moon landing were 2001: A Space Odyssey, Barbarella, and Planet of the Apes.

Acknowledgments and monuments

The United States of America acknowledged the success of Apollo 11 with a national day of celebration on Monday, July 21, 1969. All but emergency and essential employees were allowed a paid day off from work, in both government and the private sector. The last time this had happened was the national day of mourning on Monday, November 25, 1963, to observe the state funeral of President John F. Kennedy, who had set the political goal to put a man on the Moon by the end of the 1960s.

A replica of the footprint left by Neil Armstrong is located at Tranquillity Park in Houston, Texas. The park was dedicated in 1979, a decade after the first Moon landing. In 2019 Buzz Aldrin's well-known photograph of his own footprint was depicted on the Apollo 11 50th Anniversary commemorative coins.

The Apollo 11 Cave in Namibia was named after the flight upon its successful return to Earth.

Portrayal in media

Films and television
 The 1969 documentary film, Footprints on the Moon by Bill Gibson and Barry Coe, is about the Apollo 11 mission.
 The 1971 documentary Moonwalk One is a film by Theo Kamecke.
 Footage of the landing famously introduced viewers to MTV in 1981, and served as its top and bottom of the hour identifier during the cable channel's early years. MTV producers Alan Goodman and Fred Seibert used this public domain footage to associate MTV with the most famous moment in worldwide television history. MTV also pays tribute to the classic ID by handing out astronaut statuettes (or "Moonmen") at its annual Video Music Awards.
 In the 1995 film Apollo 13, based on the real mission, Jim Lovell, Jack Swigert, Fred Haise, Ken Mattingly, Pete Conrad, and Marilyn Lovell gather in the Lovell household to watch Neil Armstrong's Apollo 11 moonwalk. Later in the film, as the crew pass around the Moon, Haise points out that they're passing over the Mare Tranquillitatis and refers to it as "Neil and Buzz's old neighborhood". Armstrong and Aldrin talk to and distract Lovell's mother as she watches news reports of her son's endangered mission.
 The 1996 television docudrama Apollo 11 filmed some of its scenes in the original Apollo Mission Control Center.
 The opening scenes of the 1996 film Independence Day show an alien mothership passing low over the Apollo 11 landing site. The tidal forces of its passing erases the famous bootprint left on the soft lunar surface.
 Portions of the Apollo 11 mission are dramatized in the 1998 HBO mini-series From the Earth to the Moon in the "Mare Tranquilitatis" episode.
 Magnificent Desolation: Walking on the Moon 3D, 2005 documentary produced by and starring Tom Hanks.
 Man on the Moon, a 2006 television opera in one act by Jonathan Dove with a libretto by Nicholas Wright,  relates the story of the Apollo 11 Moon landing and the subsequent problems experienced by Buzz Aldrin.
 The 2008 computer animated film Fly Me to the Moon centers on a fictional story of three flies that stow away on the command module Columbia and the Lunar Module Eagle, repair a fictional electrical short during the lunar insertion burn, and manage to land on the Moon. The real Buzz Aldrin briefly discusses the film during the closing credits.
 The 2009 television film Moonshot depicts the preparation for the Apollo 11 mission.
 The Apollo 11 mission is used as part of the main story line in the 2011 film Transformers: Dark of the Moon. The movie described the mission and the main reason for the Apollo program's existence as a means to investigate an alien landing on the dark side of the Moon. Aldrin has a brief cameo in the film.
 In the 2012 film Men in Black 3, Apollo 11 was used by Agent K to carry the Arc Net (a shield that protects Earth from Alien invasion) to space.  The three astronauts see the Men in Black fighting the alien villain from the cockpit, but Buzz Aldrin realizes that if they report it over the radio to Mission Control the launch will be aborted and they might never be sent to the Moon.  Armstrong nonchalantly responds to Aldrin that "I didn't see anything", and simply doesn't report it. Michael Collins apparently agreed as well.
 In the 2011-2012 show in the Kamen Rider Series, Kamen Rider Fourze, the Apollo 11 landing plays a crucial role in the flashback of the series antagonist Mitsuaki Gamou as he resolved to become an astronaut and achieve his dream to meet the alien race called the Presenters.
 The last episode of the 2015 television series The Astronaut Wives Club, "Landing", features the Apollo 11 mission.
 In Ready Jet Go!s 2016 episode, "Earth Mission to Moon", Jet, Sean, Sydney, Mindy, Celery, and Carrot, re-enact the Apollo 11 mission. Jet, Sean, and Sydney portray the Apollo 11 astronauts, and Carrot and Mindy depict the people at Mission Control. In this re-enactment, Sean plays Neil Armstrong.
 The Apollo 11 mission appears in the 2016 season 1 episode "Space Race" of the NBC series Timeless. In the episode, Lucy, Wyatt, and Rufus travel to the day of the mission, July 20, 1969, to stop Garcia Flynn from interfering with the mission. After Flynn's helper, Anthony Bruhl, launches a modern-day virus against NASA, which prevents the staff from communicating with Neil Armstrong and Buzz Aldrin, Rufus and Lucy get help from Mathematician Katherine Johnson to stop the virus and Flynn before it is too late.
 In the episode "Moonshot" of Legends of Tomorrow'''s second season, it is revealed that the Apollo 11 flagpole holds a piece of the fabled Spear of Destiny.
 The 2018 film First Man depicts Armstrong and Aldrin as they prepare for, and then accomplish, the Apollo 11 mission.
 The 2019 documentary Apollo 11 is a film by Todd Douglas Miller with restored footage of the 1969 event.
 1969, a 2019 documentary series, devotes its first episode, "Moon Shot", to the Apollo 11 mission.
 "Moondust", the 2019 seventh episode of the third season of the Netflix series The Crown, includes extensive scenes of the British royal family watching the original BBC coverage of the Apollo 11 mission. It also includes a fictionalized portrayal of the private meeting of Prince Philip, Duke of Edinburgh, with the Apollo 11 crew during their visit to Buckingham Palace, and the prince's admiration for the Apollo astronauts.
 Chasing the Moon, a July 2019 PBS three-night six-hour documentary, directed by Robert Stone, examines the events leading up to the Apollo 11 mission, the mission itself, and its legacy.
 The 2023 film Indiana Jones and the Dial of Destiny takes place in 1969 and Apollo 11 (like the entire Apollo program) will be directly related to the plot.

Music
The Byrds 1969 album Ballad of Easy Rider contains the song "Armstrong, Aldrin, and Collins" and uses the mission's countdown sequence.

Folklore

Soon after the mission a conspiracy theory arose that the landing was a hoax, a theory widely discounted by historians and scientists. It may have gained more popularity after the 1978 film Capricorn One'' portrayed a fictional NASA attempt to fake a landing on Mars.

There is a humorous and ribald urban legend that when Armstrong was a child, the wife of a neighbor named Gorsky, when asked by her husband to perform oral sex, had ridiculed him by saying "...when the kid next door walks on the Moon!" and then decades later whilst walking on the Moon Armstrong supposedly said "Good luck, Mr. Gorsky". In 1995 Armstrong said he first heard the story in California when comedian Buddy Hackett told it as a joke.

See also

 Apollo in Real Time
 Apollo 11 anniversaries
 Eisenhower dollar
 Susan B. Anthony dollar
 Moon landings in fiction

References

Cross references

Bibliography
 
 
 
 
 
 
 
 
 
 
 
 
 

Science in popular culture
Fiction about outer space
United States in popular culture
Apollo 11
Cultural depictions of Neil Armstrong
Cultural depictions of Buzz Aldrin
Cultural depictions of Michael Collins (astronaut)